The Digital Fiend is an Italian American electronic music producer based in West Virginia.

Biography

Born in Washington DC and raised in Fort Washington/Oxon Hill, Maryland, Anthony Privitera The Digital Fiend a.k.a. Mr Sound Smith, has been recording music as a drummer/percussionist since 1994 with friends from Real Earth productions which is a documentary film company out of Clinton, Maryland and now based in West Virginia, run by longtime friends and music partners Raymond, Richard and Christian Schmitt. His career in music did not begin until meeting hip hop/experimental artist Atari Blitzkrieg in 2008. Since 1994 The Digital Fiend had only done jams and recording out of fun and his love for the music and friends that came with it. Keeping the realistic thoughts on music and the business about it, Digital Fiend continues to keep up with blurring genres and not conforming to only one style of music. Since 2002 he has been experimenting with electronic equipment and adding live percussion in the mix. His Serial Port Experiments w/ Atari Blitzkrieg album is a perfect example of this.

Discography

Compilation spots

Galactic Funkyard- The Day After The End Has Begun album, Tethered Records, 2009
Mad Scientist- The Day After The Light Has Gone album, Tethered Records, 2009
Moments In Time- 12-30-99 album, Godsendant Music, 2010
BRVB- off the Perfect Blue EP, Godsendant Music, 2010
The Chill - The Moments That Unfold Before Me In Life, Godsendant Music, 2011

Singles

Genie In A Bottle Of Soap- Altered Beats, Vinyl 2003
Flip Side Of things -B side- Altered Beats, Vinyl 2003
Wired Weird- Digital Fiend Productions, 2011
Pinnacle- Digital Fiend Productions, 2001
The Crappy Recording Of Steve Sanders Somewhere In A Hotel In New Hampshire- Digital Fiend Productions, 2011

Ep's

Flawed Human Interactions- Godsendant Music, 2009
Chase The Dragon- Godsendant Music, 2011

Albums

The Quest For Circuitry- Real Earth Productions, 2002
Serial Port Experiments- Godsendant Music, 2010
Stay Cool Project One- Digital Fiend Productions, 2011
Digital Fiend and Friends Sounds For A Lazy Day- Digital Fiend Productions, 2011

1. ^ http://www.godsendant.com/gmstore/

American electronic musicians
Musicians from West Virginia